Nuvolari may refer to:
 Nuvolari (TV channel)
 Audi Nuvolari quattro, a concept car
 EAM Nuvolari S1, a limited production car
 Gran Premio Nuvolari, an automobile race
 Tazio Nuvolari (1892–1953), Italian motorcycle and racing driver